John Vratil (October 28, 1945) is a former Republican member of the Kansas Senate, representing the 11th district from 1998 to 2013. He was the Senate Vice-President from 2003 to 2013.

Electoral History
Vratil was appointed to fill the seat left vacant by the resignation of Keith Schraad. He was elected in his own right in 2000, and won re-election in 2004 and 2008.

Committee assignments
Vratil served on these legislative committees:
 Education (vice-chair)
 Ways and Means (vice-chair)
 Interstate Cooperation
 Judiciary
 Organization, Calendar and Rules
 Joint Committee on State-Tribal Relations

Major donors
Some of the top contributors to Vratil's 2008 campaign, according to the National Institute on Money in State Politics:
Kansas Association of Realtors, Kansas Medical Society, Hallmark Cards, Kansas Republican Senatorial Committee, Kansas Contractors Association, and others

Finance, insurance and real estate companies were his largest donor group.

References

External links
Kansas Senate
Project Vote Smart profile
 Follow the Money campaign contributions
 1998, 2000, 2002, 2004, 2006, 2008
Ballotpedia
Kansas Oral History Project

Republican Party Kansas state senators
Living people
1945 births
University of Kansas School of Law alumni
University of Kansas alumni
20th-century American politicians
21st-century American politicians